Celatiscincus is a genus of skinks. Both species are endemic to New Caledonia.

Species
The following 2 species, listed alphabetically by specific name, are recognized as being valid:

Celatiscincus euryotis (Werner, 1909) – southern pale-hipped skink
Celatiscincus similis Sadlier, Smith, & Bauer, 2006 – northern pale-hipped skink

Nota bene: A binomial authority in parentheses indicates that the species was originally described in a genus other than Celatiscincus.

References

 
Lizard genera
Taxa named by Ross Allen Sadlier
Taxa named by Sarah A. Smith
Taxa named by Aaron M. Bauer
Skinks of New Caledonia